Lists of indigenous peoples of Russia cover the indigenous ethnic groups in Russia other than Russians. As of 2010 these constituted about 20% of the population. The period lists are organized by the official classifications based on the number of people in each group and their location.

List of minor indigenous peoples of Russia, as defined by the Russian doctrine. The list is sorted by region
List of larger indigenous peoples of Russia
Indigenous small-numbered peoples of the North, Siberia and the Far East
List of extinct indigenous peoples of Russia

See also
Demographics of Russia
Ethnic groups in Russia
Indigenous peoples of Siberia